The Pennsylvania State Athletic Conference (PSAC) women's basketball tournament is the annual conference women's basketball championship tournament for the Pennsylvania State Athletic Conference. It is a single-elimination tournament and seeding is based on regular season records.

The tournament has been held each year since 1980.

The winner, named conference champion, receives the PSAC's automatic bid to the NCAA Women's Division II Basketball Championship.

Results

Championship records

 Schools highlighted in pink are former PSAC members.
 Mansfield, Mercyhurst, Pitt–Johnstown, Seton Hill, and Shepherd have not yet qualified for the PSAC tournament finals.

See also
PSAC men's basketball tournament

References

NCAA Division II women's basketball conference tournaments
Recurring sporting events established in 1981